Jimmy Kuzmanovski is a Canadian former soccer player who had stints in the USL A-League, and the Canadian Professional Soccer League.

Playing career 
Kuzmanovski began his professional in 2000 with the Oshawa Flames of the Canadian Professional Soccer League. In his debut season he finished as the club's top goalscorer, and was nominated and awarded the CPSL Rookie of the Year award. In 2002, he signed with the Mississauga Olympians, and he made his debut for the club on May 24, 2002 in a match against York Region Shooters. Midway through the season he was loaned out to the Toronto Lynx of the USL A-League. He made his debut for Toronto on June 9, 2002 against Charleston Battery, coming on as a substitute for former Olympian player Elvis Thomas. He later returned to Mississauga, and helped reach the postseason by finishing second in the Western Conference. He appeared in the Wild card match against North York Astros, but unfortunately were defeated by a score of 3-0.

References 

Living people
Canadian soccer players
Canadian Soccer League (1998–present) players
Soccer people from Ontario
Sportspeople from Oshawa
Toronto Lynx players
Toronto (Mississauga) Olympians players
A-League (1995–2004) players
Association football forwards
Year of birth missing (living people)